The Ribeyrolles 1918 was an attempt to manufacture an automatic rifle for the French forces. It was chambered in the experimental 8×35mm round, used straight blowback, was fed from a 25-round detachable magazine and had an effective range of 400 meters. The cartridge, which some argue was the first purpose-built intermediate cartridge, was obtained by necking down the .351 Winchester Self-Loading. Another source indicates that it was chambered in a cartridge designated 8×32mmSR.

Its official name was Carabine Mitrailleuse 1918 ("Machine Carbine 1918" in English); in a 2007 book it appears as "fusil automatique Ribeyrolles 1918". The Ribeyrolles had the distinction of being fitted with a lightweight bipod on the front (indicating an intended use as a squad automatic weapon) and a rifle bayonet identical to that of the Berthier Model 1907/15.

See also 
 Chauchat-Ribeyrolles 1918 submachine gun
 Fedorov Avtomat
 Fusil Automatique Modèle 1917
 MP 18
 Vollmer M35

References

External links
 
 
 Ribeyrolles 1918 - France's First Assault Rifle or a Failed Prototype? on Forgotten Weapons
 Image of the Ribeyrolles on Forgotten Weapons
 Carabine Mitrailleuse 1918 at Historical Firearms

8 mm firearms
Light machine guns
Machine guns of France
Rifles of France
Trial and research firearms of France
World War I French infantry weapons
World War I machine guns